A double agent is a spy for one party who poses as a spy for the other.

Double agent may also refer to:
 "Double Agent" (Joe 90)
 Tom Clancy's Splinter Cell: Double Agent, a 2006 video game
 Double Agent, a novel by Gene Stackleborg, basis of movie The Man Outside (1967 film)
 Double Agent (1987 film), a television film
 Double Agent (2003 film), a South Korean film
 Yuri Nosenko: Double Agent, a 1986 TV movie about Yuri Nosenko
 The Challenge: Double Agents, season 36 of the MTV reality competition show